Sophie Jan Thompson Womack (29 August 1954 – 17 February 2008) was an American physician who specialized in neonatology.

Womack was born in San Antonio, Texas to Clarence and Irene Thompson. She graduated from Howard University and Meharry Medical College. She received a master's degree from the University of Tennessee at Knoxville.
She was vice president of medical affairs for Harper University Hospital and Hutzel Women's Hospital and a former division chief of neonatology at Sinai-Grace Hospital. From 2004 to 2006, she served as president of Detroit Medical Center's medical staff. She was the first woman and African-American to hold that position.

She was married to the Rev. Jimmy Womack and had two daughters Brandi and Ashley.

Along with her husband, Womack formed The Coalition Inc. -- Circle of Hope, an organization that raised more than $1 million while promoting childhood health and well-being.

External links
Pioneering Doctor ' 1st Things in Many things
The Impact of Affluence - Segregation
Wayne County Medical Society of Southeast Michigan

1954 births
2008 deaths
American neonatologists
Howard University alumni
Meharry Medical College alumni
University of Tennessee alumni
20th-century American women physicians
20th-century American physicians
African-American physicians
20th-century African-American women
21st-century African-American people
21st-century African-American women